A dress code or dresscode is a set of rules about clothing.

Dress code or Dresscode may also refer to:
The Dress Code, 2000 film originally released as Bruno
dressCode, Scottish charity aiming to close the gender gap in computer science
Dresscode (TV series), Finnish TV series about fashion
 Dress Codes (book), a 2021 book by  Richard Thompson Ford

See also